Henry Hurl Humphries (8 September 1879 – 12 October 1964) was a Canadian cricketer.

He was a left-handed batsman who played one first-class match for Somerset against Sussex as part of the 1906 County Championship. He failed to score, bowl or take a catch in that match.

He later played a second first-class match for a combined Canada/USA team against Australia in Toronto in 1913, top-scoring in the first innings with 49 and bowling eight overs for 32 runs.

References 
 Cricket Archive profile
 Cricinfo profile

1879 births
1964 deaths
Canadian cricketers
Cricketers from Ontario
Somerset cricketers